Koleh Bid (also Romanized as Koleh Bīd; also known as Kal Bīd, Kolabīd, and Kolbīd) is a village in Sang Sefid Rural District, Qareh Chay District, Khondab County, Markazi Province, Iran. At the 2006 census, its population was 149, in 33 families.

References 

Populated places in Khondab County